South Hulu Sungai Regency is one of the regencies (kabupaten) in South Kalimantan province, Indonesia. It had an area of 1,804.94 km2, and a population of 212,485 at the 2010 Census and 228,006 at the 2020 Census; the official estimate as at mid 2021 was 229,960. The capital is the town of Kandangan, which famous for its culinary ketupat Kandangan.

Administrative districts
South Hulu Sungai Regency is divided into eleven districts (kecamatan), tabulated below with their areas and their populations at the 2010 Census and 2020 Census, together with the official estimates as at mid 2021. The table includes the locations of the district administrative centres, the number of administrative villages (rural desa and urban kelurahan) in each district, and its post code.

References

External links 
 

Regencies of South Kalimantan